Translation changes everything: Theory and practice is a collection of essays written by translation theorist Lawrence Venuti. during the period 2000–2012.

Venuti conceives translation as an interpretive act with far-reaching social effects, at once enabled and constrained by specific cultural situations. The selection sketches the trajectory of his thinking about translation while engaging with the main trends in research and commentary. The issues covered include basic concepts like equivalence, retranslation, and reader reception; sociological topics like the impact of translations in the academy and the global cultural economy; and philosophical problems such as the translator's unconscious and translation ethics.

Essays within book

Scholarly reviews 
Wei Liu in Perspectives Studies in Translatology published 1 December 2013.

John-Mark Philo in Oxford Comparative Criticism & Translation (OCCT) published 6 August 2014.

Anthony Pym in European Legacy – Toward New Paradigms published 3 October 2015.

References

2012 non-fiction books
Essays about translation
Routledge books